In military doctrine, countervalue is the targeting of an opponent's assets that are of value but not actually a military threat, such as cities and civilian populations. Counterforce is the targeting of an opponent's military forces and facilities. The Oxford English Dictionary, 2nd ed., records the first use of the word in 1660 and the first use in the modern sense in 1965 in which it is described as a "euphemism for attacking cities".

Theory

In warfare, particularly nuclear warfare, enemy targets can be divided into two general types: counterforce military targets and countervalue civilian targets. Those terms were not used during the Second World War bombing of civilian populations and other targets that were not directly military.

The rationale behind countervalue targeting is that if two sides have both achieved assured destruction capability, and the nuclear arsenals of both sides have the apparent ability to survive a wide range of counterforce attacks and carry out a second strike in response, the value diminishes in an all-out nuclear war of targeting the opponent's nuclear arsenal, and the value of targeting the opponent's cities and civilians increases. That line of reasoning, however, assumes that the opponent values its civilians over its military forces.

One view argues that countervalue targeting upholds nuclear deterrence because both sides are more likely to believe in each other's no first use policy.  The line of reasoning is that if an aggressor strikes first with nuclear weapons against an opponent's countervalue targets, such an attack, by definition, does not degrade its opponent's military capacity to retaliate.

The opposing view, however, counters that countervalue targeting is neither moral nor credible because if an aggressor strikes first with nuclear weapons against only a limited number of a defender's counterforce military targets, the defender should not retaliate in this situation against the aggressor's civilian populace.

However, another position is that because it is the aggressor and so starts the conflict, it should not be treated with a "gloves-on" approach, which would give a further incentive to be an aggressor.

Use in modern warfare
Countervalue operations are a standard part of Russian military doctrine, in particular the shelling of cities and civilian populations with rocket and conventional artillery. Russian countervalue operations in Ukraine have led to international condemnation. The attack on the Nord Stream pipelines, blamed by most sources on Russia, is considered a countervalue attack on EU infrastructure.

International law

The intentional targeting of civilians with military force, such as nuclear weapons, is prohibited by international law. In particular, the Fourth Geneva Convention forbids attacks on certain types of civilian targets, and Protocol I states that civilian objects are not acceptable military targets. (Not all states are party to Protocol I.) Nonetheless, "proportional" collateral damage is allowed, which could justify attacks on military objectives in cities. Many strategic military facilities like bomber airfields were located near cities. Command and control centers were located in Moscow; Washington, DC; and other cities.

See also
First strike (nuclear strategy)
Second strike
Counterforce
Mutually Assured Destruction
Deterrence theory
Peace through strength
Balance of terror
Balance of power in international relations
Revenge
Scorched earth

References

Civilians in war
Military strategy
Nuclear strategy
Nuclear warfare